Paranthan is a town in Kilinochchi District, Sri Lanka. It is located about 5 km from district capital Kilinochchi.

History

Creation (1936)

The city of Paranthan was established in 1936 as part of a colonization project that sought to ease overpopulation and unemployment in Jaffna.

Civil war
The town was recaptured from the Liberation Tigers of Tamil Eelam by the 58 Division of the Sri Lankan Army on January 1, 2009.

References

See also

Kilinochchi
Elephant Pass

1936 establishments in Ceylon
Towns in Kilinochchi District
Kandavalai DS Division